P. terrestris may refer to:
 Pedilochilus terrestris, an orchid species in the genus Pedilochilus
 Phaeotrichoconis terrestris, a plant pathogen species
 Phyllastrephus terrestris, a songbird species
 Phytophthora terrestris, a water mould species
 Pseudotetracystis terrestris, an alga species in the genus Pseudotetracystis
 Pyrenochaeta terrestris, a fungal plant pathogen species

See also
 Terrestris